Thiruvedhikudi is a village in the Thanjavur taluk of Thanjavur district, Tamil Nadu, India.  The village is famous for the Vedapuriswarar Temple.

Demographics 

As per the 2001 census, Thiruvedhikudi had a total population of 1358 with 655 males and 703 females. The sex ratio was 1073. The literacy rate was 67.89.

References 

 

Villages in Thanjavur district